Toribio Romo González, known as Saint Toribio Romo (April 16, 1900 – February 25, 1928) was a Mexican Catholic priest and martyr who was killed during the anti-clerical persecutions of the Cristero War. Beatified and later canonized by Pope John Paul II along with 24 other saints and martyrs of the Cristero War, he is popularly venerated in Mexico and among Mexican immigrants, particularly for his reported miraculous appearances to migrants seeking to cross the Mexico–United States border.

Life
He had two siblings: a sister, María, and a younger brother, Román, who would also go on to become a priest. 

Though initially countered by his parents, in 1912, at age thirteen, he entered the Auxiliary Seminary of San Juan de los Lagos, before transferring to the Major Diocesan Seminary of Guadalajara in 1920. He was created a deacon on September 22, 1922, and ordained a priest a few months later, on December 23, at the age of twenty-two, after being granted a dispensation due to his exceedingly young age. He celebrated his first public mass on January 5, 1923.

Toribio's ministry was characterized by a heavy emphasis on catechesis to the poor, as well as the centrality of the eucharist to Christian life. During his brief priesthood, he served in parishes in the towns of Sayula, Tuxpan, Yahualica and Cuquío, all of them in his native state of Jalisco.

Starting in November 1926, after a revolt in the town of Cuquío against the anti-clerical persecutions of Mexican president Plutarco Elías Calles, he was forced to take up an itinerant lifestyle along with Justino Orona, the parish priest of Cuquío. After relocating almost a dozen times, his final residence was the rural settlement of Agua Caliente, in the outskirts of the town of Tequila, where he was sent to hide and was offered refuge by a local landowner. There, he was joined by his brother and sister, and he continued to secretly carry out his priestly ministry from an abandoned distillery and by visiting parishioners in the town of Tequila by night.

Death
On Friday, February 24, 1928, he spent his day organizing the parish registry. Two days before he had sent his brother away to safety. Toribio finished his work in the early hours of February 25 and went to bed. An hour later, government troops arrived and broke into the bedroom where he was sleeping. One of the soldiers reportedly shouted: "Here is the priest, kill him!" He said, "Here I am, but do not kill me."
 
Another soldier, however, fired, and Toribio rose from his bed and took a few steps before a second bullet caused him to fall into the arms of his sister, who cried in a loud voice: "Courage, Father Toribio...merciful Christ, receive him! Long live Christ the King!"

Veneration

Father Toribio Romo was beatified by Pope John Paul II on November 22, 1992 and canonized on May 21, 2000. His feast day is May 21.

Despite the fact that in 1920, fearing immigrants would lose their values, Father Toribio wrote a play titled "Let's go north!", a comedy that warned migrants against traveling to the States, there is a belief among some Mexicans that Toribio Romo has appeared to some who cross the border illegally to assist them in distress. In the late 1970s migrants began telling stories about St. Toribio coming to their rescue.

The Saint Toribio Romo Fund, which bears his name, supports the work of the immigration services department of Catholic Charities in the Diocese of Monterey.

References

Additional sources
Gutierrez, Marco A. Garcia. "Toribio Romo: protector de los mojados: es un espejismo del desierto que hace milagros de carne y hueso." Contenido,  June, 2002 
Murphy, James. The Martyrdom of Saint Toribio Romo. Liguori Publications (November 1, 2007)
Thompson, Ginger. "Santa Ana de Guadalupe Journal; A Saint Who Guides Migrants to a Promised Land." The New York Times, August 14, 2002.
Sheehan, Thomas. Dictionary of Patron Saints' Names. Our Sunday Visitor (September 2001)
Chapman, Erica.  Trad. oral.  2016

External links
Tulsa Oklahoma Diocesan Shrine: Diocesan Shrine dedicated to Saint Toribio Romo located in Tulsa, Oklahoma.

1900 births
Cristero War
20th-century Mexican Roman Catholic priests
Martyred Roman Catholic priests
Mexican Roman Catholic saints
People from Jalisco
Victims of anti-Catholic violence in Mexico
1928 deaths
20th-century Roman Catholic martyrs
20th-century Christian saints
Executed Mexican people
People executed by Mexico by firearm
Beatifications by Pope John Paul II